Hymenocallis pumila is a species of spider lily native to the States of Jalisco and  Colima in western Mexico.

References

pumila
Flora of Mexico
Plants described in 1989